The knockout stage of the 2011 CONCACAF Gold Cup started on June 18 and ended with the final on June 25, 2011. The group winners and runners-up and the two best third placed teams from the group stage qualified.

Qualified teams

Bracket

All times U.S. Eastern Daylight Time (UTC−4) (Local times in parentheses)

Quarterfinals

Costa Rica vs Honduras

Mexico vs Guatemala

Jamaica vs United States

Panama vs El Salvador

Semifinals

United States vs Panama

Honduras vs Mexico

Final

External links
 

Knockout Stage